Herman Cohen (August 27, 1925 – June 2, 2002) was an American producer of B-movies during the 1950s, and helped to popularize the teen horror movie genre with films like the cult classic I Was a Teenage Werewolf.

Career
Born in Detroit, Michigan, Cohen began his career in show business as a gofer and later an usher at the Dexter Theater in Detroit, starting he was just 12. By 18, he was managing the Dexter. From there he went on to become assistant manager of the Fox Theatre (also in Detroit) — a theater featuring over 5,000 seats. After a tour of duty with the Marines, Cohen became sales manager for Columbia Pictures in the Detroit Area and moved to Hollywood to work for the publicity department of Columbia in the 1940s. In the 1950s he started producing films, first working as assistant (and later associate) producer for Jack Broder and Realart Pictures on such films as Bride of the Gorilla, Battles of Chief Pontiac (featuring Lon Chaney, Jr.), Bela Lugosi Meets a Brooklyn Gorilla and Kid Monk Baroni (featuring a 21-year-old Leonard Nimoy as a street kid turned boxer). He later worked for Allied Artists and United Artists producing such films as Target Earth, Magnificent Roughnecks (with Mickey Rooney), and Crime of Passion (with Barbara Stanwyck and Raymond Burr). Cohen also wrote the stories and/or screenplays for at least nine films, co-writing with pal Aben Kandel and sometimes using one pseudonym between them – either "Ralph Thornton" or "Kenneth Langtry" (Kandel also wrote solo for Cohen on Kid Monk Baroni and, using the Thornton moniker, on Blood of Dracula).

Cohen had greater success in the mid-50s though, with a horror film for American International — I Was a Teenage Werewolf, which he both wrote and produced. The film cost about $100,000 to make, but earned more than $2 million. He also discovered young Michael Landon, cast in the lead role for I Was a Teenage Werewolf. Cohen followed this success by writing and producing more teen horror films, such as I Was a Teenage Frankenstein, How to Make a Monster, and Blood of Dracula. In a 1991 interview with Tom Weaver, Cohen reflected, "I have always felt that most teenagers think that adults – their parents, or their teacher, anyone who was older and who had authority – were culprits in their lives."

Cohen also occasionally appeared in his own films, usually as an uncredited extra. He played the director in the projection room in How to Make a Monster, and can also be seen in I Was a Teenage Werewolf, Konga, Black Zoo, Crooks and Coronets, and Trog.

In the 1960s and 1970s, he began producing horror films in the United Kingdom, working with such stars as Joan Crawford in Berserk! and Trog, and Jack Palance in Craze. In 1961, he returned to his roots in Detroit, purchasing the Fox Theater he had worked for in his youth. By the late 1970s, Cohen was working more in writing and distribution than in film production. He founded Cobra Media, a domestic distribution company, in 1981.

Cohen died of throat cancer on June 2, 2002, at age 76.

Filmography as producer
The Bushwhackers (1952)
Kid Monk Baroni (1952)
Bela Lugosi Meets a Brooklyn Gorilla (1952)
Battles of Chief Pontiac (1952)
River Beat (1954)
Target Earth (1954)
Magnificent Roughnecks (1956)
Dance with Me Henry (1956)
The Brass Legend (1956)
Crime of Passion (1957)
I Was a Teenage Werewolf (1957)
I Was a Teenage Frankenstein (1957)
Blood of Dracula (1957)
How to Make a Monster (1958)
Horrors of the Black Museum (1959)
The Headless Ghost (1959)
Konga (1961)
Black Zoo (1963)
A Study in Terror (1965)
Berserk! (1967)
Django il bastardo (1969)
Crooks and Coronets (1969)
Trog (1970)
Craze (1974)
Watch Me When I Kill (1977)

Filmography as writer
I Was a Teenage Werewolf (1957) (with Aben Kandel, both credited as "Ralph Thornton")
I Was a Teenage Frankenstein (1957) (with Aben Kandel, both credited as "Kenneth Langtry")
How to Make a Monster (1958) (with Aben Kandel, both credited as "Kenneth Langtry")
Horrors of the Black Museum (1959)
The Headless Ghost (1959) (with Aben Kandel, both credited as "Kenneth Langtry")
Konga (1961)
Black Zoo (1963)
Berserk! (1967)
Craze (1974)

References

External links 
 Herman Cohen fansite
 Obituary at the Los Angeles Times

1925 births
2002 deaths
American film producers
American male screenwriters
Deaths from esophageal cancer
20th-century American male writers
20th-century American screenwriters